A constitutional referendum was held in Uruguay on 24 November 1946, alongside general elections. Two options for amending the constitution were put to voters, but both were rejected.

Proposals
Two proposals for amending the constitution were put to voters. Proposal 1 was put forward by the Battlismo faction of the Colorado Party and the Independent National Party, and would allow government initiatives to be approved by two-fifths of members of the Chamber of Deputies, would bring back the Colegiado system of government, and separate election dates. Proposal 2 was put forward by the Civic Union, and would allow referendums to be held on constitutional changes if 10% of registered voters signed a petition, would allow for the separate election of the President and Vice President, and also scrap the lema system.

Results

References

1946 referendums
1946 in Uruguay
Referendums in Uruguay
Constitutional referendums in Uruguay
November 1946 events in South America